The ARIA Singles Chart ranks the best-performing singles in Australia. Its data, published by the Australian Recording Industry Association, is based collectively on each single's weekly physical and digital sales. In 2012, seventeen singles claimed the top spot, including LMFAO's "Sexy and I Know It", which started its peak position in late 2011. Seventeen acts achieved their first number-one single in Australia, either as a lead or featured artist: Foster the People, Sia, Gym Class Heroes, Neon Hitch, Fun, Janelle Monáe, Carly Rae Jepsen, Karise Eden, Justice Crew, Lupe Fiasco, Psy, Swedish House Mafia, John Martin, Samantha Jade, Macklemore & Ryan Lewis and Wanz.

Fun and Flo Rida earned two number-one songs during the year. Flo Rida's "Whistle" was the longest-running number-one single of 2012, having topped the ARIA Singles Chart for eight weeks. Carly Rae Jepsen's "Call Me Maybe" and Macklemore and Ryan Lewis' "Thrift Shop" each topped the chart for five consecutive weeks, while Flo Rida's "Wild Ones", Psy's "Gangnam Style" and Guy Sebastian's "Battle Scars" all stayed at number one for six consecutive weeks. Sebastian is the only Australian male artist in the chart's history to achieve six number-one singles.

Chart history

Number-one artists

See also
2012 in music
List of number-one albums of 2012 (Australia)
List of top 25 singles for 2012 in Australia
List of top 10 singles for 2012 in Australia

References

Number-one singles
Australia
2012